Cantagalo / Copacabana Station is a station on Line 1 of the Rio de Janeiro Metro located in the Copacabana borough of Rio de Janeiro, Brazil. The station was opened in 2007.

Nearby locations 
Parque do Corte do Cantagalo
Lagoa Rodrigo de Freitas
Praia de Copacabana
Cinema Roxy

References 

Metrô Rio stations
Railway stations opened in 2007